Roman Vasyliovych Karakevych (born 13 November 1981 in Shklo, Ukrainian SSR) is a Ukrainian football striker who plays for Naftovyk in the Ukrainian Premier League.

External links 
 Profile on Official Website

1981 births
Living people
Ukrainian footballers
FC Naftovyk-Ukrnafta Okhtyrka players
Association football forwards
Sportspeople from Lviv Oblast